Spine is a biweekly peer-reviewed medical journal covering research in the field of orthopaedics, especially concerning the spine. It was established in 1976 and is published by  Lippincott Williams & Wilkins. The current editor-in-chief is Andrew J. Schoenfeld, M.D.. Spine is considered the leading orthopaedic journal covering cutting-edge spine research. Spine is available in print and online. Spine is considered the most cited journal in orthopaedics.

Affiliated societies 
The following societies are affiliated with Spine:

References

External links 
 

Biweekly journals
Lippincott Williams & Wilkins academic journals
Publications established in 1976
English-language journals
Orthopedics journals